Slowinski may refer to:

People 
 David Slowinski, mathematician 
 Edward Slowinski, Canadian ice hockey player
 Joseph Bruno Slowinski, American herpetologist
 Paul Slowinski, Polish-Australian kickboxer

Places 
 Słowiński National Park - Poland

Other 
 Slowinski's corn snake